Syed Javed Ali Shah (born 6 January 1955) is a Pakistani politician who served as Minister for Water Resources, in Abbasi cabinet from August 2017 to May 2018. He had been a member of the National Assembly of Pakistan, between 1990 and May 2018 and had been a member of the Provincial Assembly of the Punjab from 1988 to 1990.

Early life
He was born on 6 January 1955.

He has the degree  of Bachelor of Laws LL.B .

Political career

Shah was elected to the Provincial Assembly of Punjab from Constituency PP-168 (Multan) as a candidate of Pakistan Peoples Party (PPP) in 1988 Pakistani general election.

He was elected to the National Assembly of Pakistan as a candidate of Islami Jamhoori Ittehad (IJI) from Constituency NA-119 (Multan-VI) in 1990 Pakistani general election. He received 66,900 votes and defeated Rana Shaukat Hayat, a candidate of Pakistan Democratic Alliance (PDA).

He was re-elected to the National Assembly as a candidate of Pakistan Muslim League (N) (PML-N) from Constituency NA-119 (Multan-VI) in 1993 Pakistani general election. He received 63,091 votes and defeated Rana Shaukat Hayat, a candidate of PPP.

He was re-elected to the National Assembly as a candidate of PML-N from Constituency NA-119 (Multan-VI) in 1997 Pakistani general election. He received 71,953 votes and defeated Malik Ghulam Abbas Khakhi, a candidate of PPP.

He ran for the seat of the National Assembly as a candidate of PML-N from Constituency NA-152 (Multan-V) in 2002 Pakistani general election but was unsuccessful. He received 36,870 votes and lost the seat to Assad Murtaza Gilani.

He remained a member of the Senate of Pakistan from 2006 to 2012.

He was re-elected to the National Assembly as a candidate of PML-N from Constituency NA-152 (Multan-V) in 2013 Pakistani general election. He received 81,015 votes and defeated Muhammad Ibraheem Khan, a candidate of Pakistan Tehreek-e-Insaf.

Following the election of Shahid Khaqan Abbasi as Prime Minister of Pakistan in August 2017, he was inducted into the federal cabinet of Abbasi. He was appointed as the Federal Minister for Water Resources. Upon the dissolution of the National Assembly on the expiration of its term on 31 May 2018, Shah ceased to hold the office as Federal Minister for Water Resources.

References

Living people
Pakistan Muslim League (N) MNAs
Punjabi people
People from Multan
1955 births
Pakistani MNAs 1990–1993
Pakistani MNAs 1993–1996
Pakistani MNAs 1997–1999
Pakistani MNAs 2013–2018
Members of the Senate of Pakistan
Government ministers of Pakistan
Punjab MPAs 1988–1990
Pakistan People's Party MPAs (Punjab)